Prymno (minor planet designation: 261 Prymno) is a somewhat large Main belt asteroid. It is classified as a B-type asteroid and probably has a primitive composition not unlike common C-type carbonaceous asteroids.

It was discovered by C. H. F. Peters on October 31, 1886, in Clinton, New York and was named after the Greek Oceanid Prymno.

References 

The Asteroid Orbital Elements Database
Minor Planet Discovery Circumstances
Asteroid Lightcurve Data File

External links 
 Lightcurve plot of 261 Prymno, Palmer Divide Observatory, B. D. Warner (2009)
 Asteroid Lightcurve Database (LCDB), query form (info )
 Dictionary of Minor Planet Names, Google books
 Asteroids and comets rotation curves, CdR – Observatoire de Genève, Raoul Behrend
 Discovery Circumstances: Numbered Minor Planets (1)-(5000) – Minor Planet Center
 
 

Background asteroids
Prymno
Prymno
B-type asteroids (Tholen)
X-type asteroids (SMASS)
18861031